José Raoul de Capriles (February 13, 1912 – February 21, 1969) was an American foil and épée fencer. He competed at the 1936, 1948 and 1952 Summer Olympics.

See also
List of USFA Division I National Champions

References

External links
 

1912 births
1969 deaths
American male épée fencers
Olympic fencers of the United States
Fencers at the 1936 Summer Olympics
Fencers at the 1948 Summer Olympics
Fencers at the 1952 Summer Olympics
Fencers from Mexico City
American male sabre fencers